Gati Shakti Vishwavidyalaya (GSV; formerly National Rail and Transportation Institute) is India's first transport University located in Vadodara, Gujarat, India. The University is presently located inside the lush green 55-acre campus of Ministry of Railways's apex training institution, National Academy of Indian Railways (NAIR).

History

The University, a vision of Prime Minister of India Narendra Modi, is India's first University exclusively focused on transport-related education, multidisciplinary research and training. Established as a Deemed to be University under the de Novo starting of something new] category, and converted to a Central University and named as Gati Shakti Vishwavidyalaya (GSV) on 06/12/2022, the University is specifically established to create a resource pool for the railway and transportation sector.

A unique feature of programmes at GSV is the using "live laboratories", the facilities and infrastructure of Indian Railways and associated establishments. The University has forged academic partnerships with ivy league and top-ranked global universities including Cornell University, United States; University of California in Berkeley, United States; Russia University of Transport (MIIT) in Moscow, Russia; University of Birmingham, UK. and St. Petersburg State Transport University.

List of courses
Currently, it is running following postgraduate and undergraduate programs -

Masters
 Master of Business Administration (M.B.A.) in Logistics and Supply Chain Management
 Master of Business Administration (M.B.A.) in Transport Economics and Management
 Master of Science (M.Sc.) in Transportation Technology and Policy
 Master of Science (M.Sc.) in Transportation Information Systems and Analytics
 Master of Science (M.Sc.) in Railway Systems Engineering and Integration

Bachelors
 Bachelor of Business Administration (B.B.A.) in Transportation Management
 Bachelor of Science (B.Sc.) in Transportation Technology
 Bachelor of Technology (B.Tech) in Rail Infrastructure Engineering 
 Bachelor of Technology (B.Tech) in Rail Systems & Communication Engineering 
 Bachelor of Technology (B.Tech) in Mechanical & Rail Engineering.  

At present, the University has more than 700 students enrolled from across Indian. Once the project is fully executed, it will have close to 3000 full-time residential students on its rolls, across five schools - Management & Leadership; Engineering & Applied Science; Transport Planning & Design; Humanities, Arts & Social Sciences, and Transport Policy & Law.

Course and Curriculum

Both the undergraduate courses, BBA in Transportation Management and BSc in Transportation Technology, run in trimester mode with nine trimesters in total, having a duration of three years and are worth 140 credits. 

There are two compulsory internships on offer for practical exposure, one with Indian Railways at the end of first year, and the other one with industry, at the end of sophomore year. In addition, all the undergraduate students compulsorily have to submit a thesis/project at the end of their degree. Syllabus for first year for both the degrees is the same, as it is foundational in nature.

An indicative list of courses:

Foundation - Dynamics of Transportation Ecosystems, Critical Thinking and Writing, Essentials of Business and Technology, Design Thinking, Systems Thinking & Application, Fundamentals of Economics, Environmental Sciences and Sustainability, Ethics, Data Analytics and Representation, Foundations of Leadership and Sociological Contexts of Transportation

Management - Principles of Accounting and Finance, Principles of Marketing, Business Communication, Managerial Economics, Business Analytics Models,  Supply Chain Planning and Control, Supply Chain Decision Modelling, Operations Management Strategy, Purchase and Materials Management, Special Topics in Transportation Management

Technology - Principles of Information Systems, Transportation Technologies of the 21st Century, Research Design, Mathematical Modelling, Transportation Models and Quantitative Methods, Dynamic Programming and Decision Processes, Applied Transportation Technology, Special Topics in Transportation Technology

Admissions

Admissions to the University are only offered via a national-level i.e. JEE (Main) and CUET-UG & PG conducted by National Testing Agency (NTA).

Eligibility and Process

The eligibility to apply for the academic programmes at GSV is as follows:

MBA in Transport Economics & Management or Logistics & Supply Chain Management (UG degree in any stream with Maths or Statistics, and minimum 55% aggregate marks (50% for OBC/SC/ST), Candidates with CAT, XAT or MAT scores are exempted from entrance Test, CUET-PG)

MSc in Transportation Technology and Policy or Transport Information Systems and Analytics or Railway System Engineering and Integration (UG degree in any stream with Maths or Statistics, and minimum 55% aggregate marks (50% for OBC/SC/ST))

B.Tech in Rail Systems and Communication Engineering   (12th with PCM, admission on JEE mains score basis)

B.Tech in Rail Infrastructure Engineering   (12th with PCM, admission on JEE mains score basis)   
BBA in Transportation Management 	All Streams (10 + 2 with Math)

BSc in Transportation Technology 	Science Stream (10 + 2 with Math)

Applicants must have successfully completed their 10 + 2 Board examination with at least 55% marks (50% for OBC/SC/ST) and be below the age of 25 years as on August 1 of the said year of admission.

NRTI follows Government Regulations with respect to reservations, which is as follows:

General     - 40.5%
OBC         - 27%
SC          - 15%
ST          - 7.5%
EWS         - 10%

Supernumerary seats will also be considered for PwD, Kashmiri Migrants and Ex-Servicemen, as per Government Regulations.

The Merit list Rank for respective categories (GEN, OBC, EWS, SC, ST & EWS) are based on Entrance Test scores and are published on the GSV website post result declaration. Provisionally selected students, along with high ranked waitlisted candidates, are called for counselling at the NRTI campus, Vadodara. If there are any vacant seats after the 1st round of counselling, additional waitlisted students are called in the order of merit for the 2nd round of counselling.

Timeline
 May 2018: NRTI given Deemed to be University status by University Grants Commission.
 Sep 2018: Academic sessions starts. 103 students shortlisted on basis of NRTI Aptitude test held in July-2018 for fully residential three year Bachelor of Science in Transportation Technology and Bachelor of Business Administration in Transport Management.
 Dec 2018: NRTI dedicated to nation by Railway minister Piyush Goyal and Chief Minister of Gujarat Vijay Rupani.

References 

 Deemed universities in India
 Training institutes of Indian Railways
Buildings and structures in Vadodara
2018 establishments in Gujarat
Educational institutions established in 2018